Mobarakabad (also Romanized as Mobārakābād; also known as Mālekābād and Malikābād) is a village in Shakhen Rural District, in the Central District of Birjand County, South Khorasan Province, Iran. At the 2016 census, its population was 460, in 129 families.

References 

Populated places in Birjand County